Marcus Fulvius Flaccus was a consul in 264 BC. In the tradition of Livy, his praenomen is "Quintus".

In his consulship, Fulvius Flaccus concluded the siege of Volsinii (Etruscan: Velzna), which his predecessor Quintus Fabius Maximus Gurges had started, and been killed while conducting; after plundering the city, he ordered it razed and the survivors relocated. The Fasti Triumphales record he celebrated a triumph on 1 November 264 BC. In the 1960s, his donarium was recovered from Sant'Omobono in Rome, and the number of scars on the top of the monument confirm the quantity of statues he brought from Volsinii to Rome. It was the last Etruscan city to be taken by the Romans.

References 

3rd-century BC Roman consuls
3rd-century BC Roman generals
Marcus consul 490 AUC
Roman triumphators